A total lunar eclipse occurred on February 20 and February 21, 2008. It was visible in the eastern evening sky on February 20 for all of North and South America, and on February 21 in the predawn western sky from most of Africa and Europe. Greatest Eclipse occurring on Thursday, February 21, 2008, at 03:26:03 UTC, totality lasting 49 minutes and 45.6 seconds.

Occurring 7.1 days after perigee (Perigee on February 14, 2008) and 6.9 days before apogee (Apogee on February 28, 2008), the Moon's apparent diameter was near the average diameter.

The total lunar eclipse was the first of the two lunar eclipses in 2008, with the second, the August 16, 2008 event being partial. The next total lunar eclipse occurred on December 21, 2010. The tables below contain detailed predictions and additional information on the Total Lunar Eclipse of 21 February 2008.

The moon's apparent diameter was 26.2 arcseconds larger than the August 16, 2008 partial lunar eclipse.

Eclipse season 

This is the second eclipse this season.

First eclipse this season: 7 February 2008 Annular Solar Eclipse

Date = 21 February 2008
Penumbral Magnitude = 2.14507
Umbral Magnitude = 1.10618
Gamma: -0.39923
Greatest Eclipse: 21 Feb 2008 03:26:03.3 UTC (03:27:08.8 TD)
Ecliptic Opposition: 21 Feb 2008 03:30:30.8 UTC (03:31:36.3 TD)
Equatorial Opposition: 21 Feb 2008 03:48:25.7 UTC (03:49:31.2 TD)
Sun right ascension: 22 hours, 15 minutes, 30.0 seconds
Moon right ascension: 10 hours, 14 minutes, 48.5 seconds
Earth's shadow right ascension: 10 hours, 15 minutes, 30.0 seconds
Sun declination: 10 degrees, 48 minutes, 31.3 seconds south of Celestial Equator
Moon declination: 10 degrees, 28 minutes, 7.6 seconds north of Celestial Equator
Earth's shadow declination: 10 degrees, 48 minutes, 31.3 seconds north of Celestial Equator
Sun diameter: 1941.0 arcseconds
Moon diameter: 1868.4 arcseconds
Penumbra diameter: 2 degrees, 1684.08 arcseconds (8884.08 arcseconds)
Umbra diameter: 1 degree, 1402.56 arcseconds (5002.56 arcseconds)
Saros Series: 133rd (26 of 71)
Node: Descending Node

Viewing 

The eclipse was visible in the eastern evening sky on February 20 for all of North and South America, and on February 21 in the predawn western sky from most of Africa and Europe.

The penumbral eclipse began at 00:35 UTC (February 21), and ended at 6:17. A partial eclipse existed from 1:43 until 3:00, followed by 51 minutes of totality (3:00 - 3:51), and then partial again from 3:51 until 5:09. (For local times, see Timing.)

It is possible to mistake the appearance of partial eclipse as the moon being in a different phase, but the shadow from the eclipse changes much more rapidly.

The bright star Regulus of Leo and the planet Saturn were prominent very near the moon during the total eclipse portion. Shortly before the eclipse began, Regulus was occulted by the moon in parts of the far Southern Atlantic Ocean and Antarctica.

Map

Relation to other lunar eclipses

Eclipses of 2008 
 An annular solar eclipse on February 7.
 A total lunar eclipse on February 21.
 A total solar eclipse on August 1.
 A partial lunar eclipse on August 16.

Lunar year series

Saros series 

This lunar eclipse is part of series 133 of the Saros cycle, which repeats every 18 years and 11 days. Series 133 runs from the year 1557 until 2819. The previous eclipse of this series occurred on February 9, 1990, and the next will occur on March 3, 2026.

It is the 6th of 21 total lunar eclipses in series 133. The first was on December 28, 1917. The last (21st) will be on August 3, 2278. The longest two occurrences of this series (14th and 15th) will last for a total of 1 hour and 42 minutes on May 18, 2152, and May 30, 2170. Solar saros 140 interleaves with this lunar saros with an event occurring every 9 years 5 days alternating between each saros series.

Metonic cycle (19 years) 

This is the fourth of five Metonic lunar eclipses.

Half-Saros cycle 
A lunar eclipse will be preceded and followed by solar eclipses by 9 years and 5.5 days (a half saros). This lunar eclipse is related to two annular solar eclipses of Solar Saros 140.

Timing
The moon entered the penumbral shadow at 0:36 UTC, and the umbral shadow at 1:43. Totality lasted for 50 minutes, between 3:01 and 3:51. The moon left the umbra shadow at 5:09 and left the penumbra shadow at 6:16.

Photo gallery

Composites

North America

Canada

USA (west)

USA (east)

South America

Europe and Africa

See also
 List of lunar eclipses in the 21st century
 Lists of lunar eclipses
 Solar eclipse
 :File:2008-02-21 Lunar Eclipse Sketch.gif Chart

Notes

External links

 NASA: Total Lunar Eclipse: February 20, 2008
 NASA Saros series 133
 
 Hermit eclipse (Ian Cameron Smith) Total Lunar Eclipse: February 21, 2008
 Photos
 Astronet: Information and live webcasts of the February 20-21 total lunar eclipse from the Netherlands, Belgium, Germany, Spain and Argentina
 NASA Astronomy Picture of the Day: February 20, 2008, February 22, 2008 March 1, 2008
 Sky&Telescope, Eclipses of 2008
 Example Images from Dr. Eric S. Ackerman - Fort Lauderdale, Florida 
 Various Animations of the Eclipse Astronight Observatory - Billerica MA
 SpaceWeather Lunar Eclipse Photo Gallery: February 20, 2008
 Philadelphia, PA: A timelapse of the total lunar eclipse on February 20th, 2008. Recorded with still images.
 Feature No Longer Available | Weather Underground 

2008-02
2008 in science
February 2008 events